James L. Huffman (born 17 October 1941) is an American historian.

Huffman obtained a bachelor of arts degree at Indiana Wesleyan University, and studied journalism at Northwestern University before he completed graduate study at the University of Michigan, earning a master's degree in Asian studies and a doctorate in history. Huffman worked as a journalist prior to teaching at the University of Nebraska–Lincoln, Indiana Wesleyan University, Williams College, and Dartmouth College. He joined the faculty of Wittenberg University, where he was named H. Orth Hirt Professor of History and taught for three decades until his retirement in May 2007. In March 2017, the Association for Asian Studies honored Huffman with its Distinguished Service Award.

References

1941 births
Living people
Writers from Indiana
Historians of Japan
Indiana Wesleyan University alumni
Northwestern University alumni
University of Michigan alumni
Indiana Wesleyan University faculty
Dartmouth College faculty
Williams College faculty
20th-century American journalists
American male journalists
American Japanologists
 Wittenberg University faculty
21st-century American historians
21st-century American male writers
20th-century American historians
20th-century American male writers
American male non-fiction writers